Paulus Kessels (1 February 1901 – 9 May 1987) was a Dutch sports shooter. He competed in the 25 m pistol event at the 1948 Summer Olympics.

References

1901 births
1987 deaths
Dutch male sport shooters
Olympic shooters of the Netherlands
Shooters at the 1948 Summer Olympics
Sportspeople from Tilburg